The Evans Ice Stream is a large ice stream draining from Ellsworth Land, between Cape Zumberge and Fowler Ice Rise, into the western part of the Ronne Ice Shelf. Mills Glacier flows adjacently into the ice stream from the southwest side. The feature was recorded on February 5, 1974, in Landsat imagery. It was named by the UK Antarctic Place-Names Committee for Stanley Evans, a British physicist who, starting in 1961, developed apparatus for radio echo sounding of icecaps and glaciers from aircraft; he carried out upper atmosphere research at Brunt Ice Shelf, 1956–57.

See also
 List of glaciers in the Antarctic
 Glaciology

Further reading 
 Ashmore, David & Bingham, Robert G & Hindmarsh, Richard. (2012), Mapping in situ radar absorption within Evans Ice Stream, West Antarctic,  Annals of Glaciology, 67, 29–38, doi: 10.3189/2014AoG67A052.
  C.J. van der Veen, Johannes Oerlemans,  Dynamics of the West Antarctic Ice Sheet: Proceedings of a Workshop held in Utrecht, May 6 - 8, 1985, PP 59, 71
 Ute Christina Herzfeld, Atlas of Antarctica: Topographic Maps from Geostatistical Analysis of Satellite Radar Altimeter Data, P 201
 Sykes, H.J., Murray, T., Luckman, A., The grounding zone of the Evans Ice Stream, Antarctica, investigated using SAR interferometry and modelling, Annals Glaciol., 50(52), 35–40, 2009, DOI (Published version): 10.3189/172756409789624292

External links 

 Evans Ice Stream on USGS website
 Evans Ice Stream on SCAR website

References 

Filchner-Ronne Ice Shelf
Ice streams of Ellsworth Land